The moustached barbet (Psilopogon incognitus) is an Asian barbet.  Barbets are a group of near passerine birds with a world-wide tropical distribution. They get their name from the bristles which fringe their heavy bills.

The moustached barbet is a resident breeder in the hills of Myanmar, Thailand, Cambodia, Laos and  Vietnam. It is a species of broadleaf evergreen forest from 600–700 m. It nests in a tree hole.

This barbet is 23 cm in length. It is a plump bird, with a short neck, large head and short tail. The bill is dark horn, and the body plumage is green. The adult of the form, P. i. elbeli, which occurs in northern Thailand has a red forehead, green crown with a red spot at the rear, a blue face and throat, and black eyestripe and moustache. The sexes are similar, but the juvenile has a duller, greener head and throat with a narrower moustache..

The other subspecies are nominate P. i. incognitus in Myanmar and western Thailand, and P. i. eurous in east Thailand, Cambodia,  Laos and Vietnam.

The male's territorial call is a repeated loud u’ik-a-ruk u’ik-a-ruk u’ik-a-ruk.

References

Birdlife International
Robson, Craig  A Field Guide to the Birds of Thailand 
Ripley, The Barbets, The Auk Vol 62 1945

External links
Image at ADW

moustached barbet
Birds of Cambodia
Birds of Laos
Birds of Vietnam
Birds of Indochina
moustached barbet